Duwaybiq ( or ),  also known as Duniq, is a village in northern Aleppo Governorate, northwestern Syria. Nearby localities include Ihtaimlat  to the west, Dabiq  to the south, and Turkman Bareh  to the southeast.

Demographics
In the 2004 census, Duwaybiq had a population of 1,862. Traveler Martin Hartmann noted the village as a Turkish village in late 19th century.

References

Populated places in Azaz District
Turkmen communities in Syria